In the 1897–98 season, the Woolwich Arsenal F.C. played 30 games, won 16 and lost 9. The team finished 5th in the season

Results
Arsenal's score comes first

Football League Second Division

Final League table

FA Cup

References

1897-98
English football clubs 1897–98 season